John Paul Hammond (born November 13, 1942 in New York City) is an American singer and musician. The son of record producer John H. Hammond, he is sometimes referred to as John Hammond Jr.

Background
Hammond is a son of record producer and talent scout John H. Hammond and his first wife, Jemison McBride, an actress. He is a descendant of Cornelius Vanderbilt, the patriarch of the prominent Vanderbilt family, through his paternal grandmother Emily Vanderbilt Sloane Hammond. He has a brother, Jason, and a stepsister, (Esme) Rosita Sarnoff, the daughter of his father's second wife, Esme O'Brien Sarnoff. Hammond's middle name, Paul, is in honor of a friend of his father, the actor Paul Robeson. The younger Hammond was raised by his mother and saw his father only a few times a year while growing up.

He began playing guitar in high school, partially inspired by the album Jimmy Reed at Carnegie Hall. He attended Antioch College for one year but dropped out to pursue a music career. By the mid-1960s he was touring nationally and living in Greenwich Village. He befriended and recorded with many electric blues musicians in New York, including Jimi Hendrix, Eric Clapton, Levon Helm's New Hawks (later known as the Band), Mike Bloomfield, Dr. John, and Duane Allman.

Career
Hammond usually plays acoustically, choosing National Reso-Phonic Guitars, and sings in a barrelhouse style. Since 1962, when he made his debut on Vanguard Records, he has made thirty-four albums. In the 1990s he began recording on the Point Blank Records label. His 1963 debut album, John Hammond, was one of the first blues albums by a white artist. Hammond has earned one Grammy Award and been nominated for four others. He also provided the soundtrack for the 1970 film Little Big Man, starring Dustin Hoffman.

Although critically acclaimed, Hammond has received only moderate commercial success. Nonetheless, he enjoys a strong fan base and has earned respect from John Lee Hooker, Roosevelt Sykes, Duane Allman, Rory Gallagher, Willy Deville, Robbie Robertson, Mike Bloomfield and Charlie Musselwhite, all of whom have contributed their musical talents to his records. In addition, he is the only person who ever had both Eric Clapton and Jimi Hendrix in his band at the same time, if only for five days in the 1960s, when Hammond played The Gaslight Cafe in New York City. To his regret, they never recorded together. It has been suggested that Hammond deserves some credit for helping boost The Band to wider recognition. He recorded with several members of The Band in 1965 and recommended them to Bob Dylan, with whom they undertook a famed and tumultuous world tour.

Hammond hosted the 1991 UK television documentary The Search for Robert Johnson, detailing the life of the legendary Delta bluesman Robert Johnson.

Hammond has had a longstanding friendship with the songwriter Tom Waits and has performed Waits' songs on occasion. In 2001, he released Wicked Grin, an album consisting entirely of Waits compositions, with one exception, the traditional spiritual, "I Know I've Been Changed". Waits played guitar and sang backing vocals on the album and was also its producer.

In 2003, he released Ready for Love, produced by David Hidalgo of Los Lobos. It included a Mick Jagger and Keith Richards song, "The Spider and the Fly".

His 2009 album, entitled Rough & Tough, was a 2010 nominee for the Grammy Award for Best Traditional Blues Album.

In 2011, Hammond was inducted into the Blues Hall of Fame of the Blues Foundation.

Personal life
Hammond married his first wife, Dana McDevitt, a daughter of John Burke McDevitt, on October 21, 1967. They later divorced.

In 1991, Hammond married his second wife, Marla.

Discography
 1963 John Hammond (Vanguard)
 1964 Big City Blues (Vanguard) – includes the first blues-rock cover of Willie Dixon's "Back Door Man", later made famous by the Doors.
 1965 Country Blues (Vanguard)
 1965 So Many Roads (Vanguard)
 1967 Mirrors (Vanguard) – reissued on Real Gone Music in 2016.
 1967 I Can Tell (Atlantic)
 1968 Sooner or Later (Atlantic) – reissued on Water Music in 2002.
 1969 Southern Fried (Atlantic) – reissued on Water Music in 2002.
 1970 The Best of John Hammond (Vanguard) compilation
 1971 Source Point (Columbia)
 1971 Little Big Man / Original Soundtrack (Columbia)
 1972 I'm Satisfied (Columbia)
 1973 Triumvirate – with Mike Bloomfield and Dr. John (Columbia)
 1975 Can't Beat the Kid (Capricorn) – reissued on Polygram in 1997.
 1976 John Hammond: Solo [live] (Vanguard)
 1978 Footwork (Vanguard)
 1979 Hot Tracks – with The Nighthawks (Vanguard)
 1980 Mileage (Rounder)
 1982 Frogs for Snakes (Rounder)
 1983 John Hammond Live (Rounder)
 1984 Spoonful (Edsel) – compilation
 1988 Nobody but You (Flying Fish) – reissued on Point Blank/Virgin in 1996.
 1992 Got Love if You Want It (Point Blank/Virgin)
 1993 You Can't Judge a Book by the Cover (Vanguard) – compilation
 1994 Trouble No More (Point Blank/Virgin)
 1996 Found True Love (Point Blank/Virgin)
 1998 Long As I Have You (Point Blank/Virgin)
 2000 The Best of the Vanguard Years (Vanguard) – compilation
 2001 Wicked Grin (Point Blank/Virgin)
 2003 At the Crossroads: The Blues of Robert Johnson (Vanguard) – compilation
 2003 Ready for Love (Back Porch/Narada)
 2005 In Your Arms Again (Back Porch/Narada)
 2006 Live in Greece [rec. 1983] (Dynamic/MSI)
 2007 Push Comes to Shove (Back Porch/Narada)
 2009 Rough & Tough (Chesky)
 2014 Timeless [live] (Palmetto)
 2019 "You Know That's Cold" b/w "Come To Find Out" [Translucent Blue 7" Single] (Need To Know)
 2020 "My Baby Loves To Boogie" and "Told You Once In August" (featuring Rory Block) with Dion from Blues with Friends

References

External links
 John Hammond Biography, Live Performance Video, Interview
 Official website for John Hammond
 Illustrated John P. Hammond discography
 
 2006 Interview
 2007 Interview with NPR's Scott Simon

20th-century American guitarists
20th-century American singers
20th-century American male singers
21st-century American guitarists
21st-century American singers
21st-century American male singers
1942 births
American blues guitarists
American blues harmonica players
American blues singers
American male guitarists
American people of Dutch descent
Antioch College alumni
Chesky Records artists
Contemporary blues musicians
Grammy Award winners
Guitarists from New York City
Living people
Palmetto Records artists
Singers from New York City
Slide guitarists
John Paul Hammond